Navid Mohammadzadeh (born April 6, 1986) is an Iranian-Kurdish actor. He has received various accolades, including two Crystal Simorgh, four Hafez Awards, three Iran Cinema Celebration Awards and four Iran's Film Critics and Writers Association Awards. In 2017, he won the Orizzonti Award for Best Actor at the 74th Venice International Film Festival for acting in No Date, No Signature (2017).

Personal life
Mohammadzadeh was born on April 6, 1986, in Tehran. He is originally a Kurd from Mehran in Ilam province.

At the age of two, he moved to Ilam and stayed there until he graduated from school. He has an associate degree in civil engineering. 

On July 19, 2021, he announced his marriage to Fereshteh Hosseini via a post on his official Instagram account.

Filmography

Film

Web

Television

Theatre

Awards and nominations

References

External links

 
 
 

1986 births
Living people
Kurdish male actors
Iranian Kurdish people
Iranian male film actors
Iranian male stage actors
People from Ilam Province
21st-century Iranian people
Crystal Simorgh for Best Supporting Actor winners